The Longstones are two standing stones, one of which is the remains of a prehistoric 'cove' of standing stones, at , close to Beckhampton in Avebury parish, in the English county of Wiltshire.

Two stones are visible, known as 'Adam' and 'Eve' although the latter is more likely to have been a stone that formed part of the Beckhampton Avenue that connected with Avebury. The avenue probably terminated here although it may have extended further to the south west beyond the stones. William Stukeley recorded the site in the eighteenth century when it was only partially destroyed and suggested it extended further although modern excavation and archaeological geophysics have not confirmed this.

Adam is the larger of the two stones, weighing an estimated 62 tons, and along with three others formed a four-sided cove. Excavations carried out jointly by the Universities of Leicester, Newport and Southampton University of Southampton in 2000 revealed the socket holes for the other stones which were tightly placed close to Adam. The cove had been open on its south eastern side which faced towards the nearby South Street barrow 130m away. The other stones were destroyed in the post-medieval period by a local landowner.

Adam fell over in 1911 and was re-erected by Maud Cunnington in 1912. She also found a Beaker inhumation of a middle-aged man buried close by the stone, which is considered to postdate the megalith. In 1933 the stones were scheduled as an ancient monument.

References

History of Wiltshire
Archaeological sites in Wiltshire
Scheduled monuments in Wiltshire
Megalithic monuments in England
Stone Age sites in England